Oliver P. Morton High School is a public secondary school located in Hammond, Indiana, United States. It is part of the School City of Hammond district.

History
The school was established in 1937 at its former location on Marshall Avenue in the Hessville section of Hammond. It became a four-year school in 1954. The current facility opened in 1968.

Notable alumni
 Darrel Chaney – former MLB player for the Cincinnati Reds and Atlanta Braves
 Frank J. Mrvan – politician
 Stan Perzanowski – former MLB player for the Chicago White Sox, Texas Rangers and Minnesota Twins

See also
 List of high schools in Indiana

References

External links
Official website

1937 establishments in Indiana
Educational institutions established in 1937
Public high schools in Indiana
Schools in Lake County, Indiana
Hammond, Indiana